Garbage Man is a 2001 Russian romance film directed by Georgy Shengeliya.

Plot 
The film takes place in a small provincial town during the winter. The film tells about the relationship of the garbage man and a girl who, for some reason, ended up in this city.

Cast 
 Aleksei Guskov
 Olesya Sudzilovskaya	
 Yelena Baromykina
 Aleksandr Berda
 Yuriy Gorin
 Vladimir Gusev
 Valeriy Ivakov
 Yuri Kolokolnikov
 Mikhail Levchenko
 Dmitri Matrosov

References

External links 
 

2001 films
2000s Russian-language films
Russian romance films
2000s romance films